The 1960 Portuguese Grand Prix was a Formula One motor race held at Circuito da Boavista, Oporto on 14 August 1960. It was race 8 of 10 in the 1960 World Championship of Drivers and race 7 of 9 in the 1960 International Cup for Formula One Manufacturers.

Scottish racing legend Jim Clark scored his first ever Formula One podium at this race.

John Surtees achieved his first pole position at this race.

Classification

Qualifying

Race

Championship standings after the race 

Drivers' Championship standings

Constructors' Championship standings

 Notes: Only the top five positions are included for both sets of standings. Only the best 6 results counted towards each Championship. Numbers without parentheses are Championship points; numbers in parentheses are total points scored.

References

Portuguese Grand Prix
Portuguese Grand Prix
Portuguese Grand Prix
Sports competitions in Porto